IZE may refer to:

International Zoo Educators Association
IZE, a DOS Personal computer text-based management system